Mervyn John Cross OAM is an Australian former rugby league footballer and orthopedic surgeon.

He played in Australia's major competition the New South Wales Rugby League (NSWRL) but Cross, a doctor, is better known for his achievements in the field of sports medicine as an Orthopaedic surgeon

Cross was known as a strong defensive forward who played for the South Sydney (1960–61), the Eastern Suburbs (1962) and North Sydney in 1963. At the end of the 1990s, Doctor Cross took up a position as an NRL board member.

Cross was awarded an Order of Australia Medal (OAM) for his revolutionary work in knee surgery. He was one of the inaugural Honorary Fellows of the Australasian College of Sport and Exercise Physicians.

Cross also worked as a director on the board of the National Rugby League until retiring in 2005.

References

External links
 The Encyclopedia Of Rugby League Players, Alan Whiticker and Glen Hudson
Merv Cross's Knee Clinic's website

Australian rugby league players
Sydney Roosters players
North Sydney Bears players
South Sydney Rabbitohs players
Australian sports physicians
Living people
Australian rugby league administrators
1941 births
Place of birth missing (living people)
Australian orthopaedic surgeons
Recipients of the Medal of the Order of Australia
Rugby league forwards